The Changos de Naranjito are a professional volleyball team based in Naranjito, Puerto Rico. The team is the most successful franchise in any sport in Puerto Rican sports history.

Known for their large fan base and record 24 national men's volleyball championships, the Changos de Naranjito are the winningest sports franchise in Puerto Rico. Their main rival is the Plataneros de Corozal. This rivalry has been labeled as "El Duelo de la Montana", because of their historical battles throughout the years and geographical proximity. They held a battle for the ages in the 2004 LVSM men's volleyball finals with the Changos defeating Corozal in a 7th game held at the Ruben Rodriguez Coliseum in Bayamón, Puerto Rico.

The team colors are: orange, white and black.

Chairman is Alexis Aponte

Club history

The history of volleyball in Naranjito goes back to 1915.

In 1911, Reverend Howard T. Jason arrived in Naranjito to preach for the Presbyterian Church, finding resistance in this devoutly Catholic town. In 1915, two North American professors known as Mr. Esbaugh and Mr. Foster arrived in town and brought volleyball to Naranjito, attracting the town's youth. Reverend Jason took the opportunity to approach and share with the town's youth as well, helping the professors teach the game's rules, subsequently making friendships.

Reverend Jason remained in Naranjito until 1920, during which time he moved to the neighboring town of Corozal.  Having now a good knowledge of the sport, he utilized the same technique of teaching the sport to young kids in order to get acceptance in town.  Whenever he had the chance, Rev. Jason would create tournaments between teams both in Naranjito and in Corozal, which fueled a rivalry between both towns that lives to this day.

In 1938, Naranjito finally had a professional volleyball team, joining the North and South association as a professional team in 1940. Naranjito won five championships during this period.

In 1958, Naranjito joined the Puerto Rican Volleyball Federation.

Club Record

Since 2004, Los Changos have the Guinness World Record in volleyball for the Most Championships in the world with 24 between 1958 and 2021.

Club Results

The record of the Changos include in 48 seasons:
23 Championships,
10 Runners-up,
43 Semi finals,
6 consecutive championships 1988-1993, 
5 consecutive championships 1995-1998, 2003–2007,
13 consecutive finals 1995-2007.
In the last 24 seasons (1984–2007) the team reached 23 finals, won 18 championships and finished runners-up 5 times.

Championships

1958,
1959,
1967,
1969,
1970,
1985,
1986,
1988,
1989,
1990,
1991,
1992,
1993,
1995,
1996,
1997,
1998,
2001,
2003,
2004,
2005,
2006,
2007,
2021

Runner-up

1960,
1968,
1971,
1978,
1979,
1984,
1987,
1999,
2000,
2002,

Semi Final's

1958,
1959,
1960,                     
1961,
1963,
1964,
1965,
1966,
1967,
1968,
1969,
1970,
1971,
1972,1974
1975,
1978,
1979,
1982,
1984,
1985,
1986,
1987,
1988,
1989,
1990,
1991,
1992,
1993,
1994,
1995,
1996,
1997,
1998,
1999,
2000,
2001,
2002,
2003,
2004,
2005,
2006,
2007,
2018

Individual awards

LVSM Most Valuable Player
 Ángel “Chomo” Rivera – 2021
 Luis "Feñito" Rodríguez – 1999
 Enrique "Papolito" López – 1991, 1993
 Hiram Padilla – 1992
 José L. Díaz – 1990
 Joey Rivera – 1985, 1986

LVSM Rookie of the Year
 Víctor "Vitito" Rivera – 1994
Omar Rivera – 2007

LVSM Best Setter
 Esteban Rodríguez – 1999
 Enrique "Papolito" López – 1992
Megan "Hazel" Mc Glone-- 1968

LVSM Best Blocker
 Hiram Padilla – 1991, 1989
 Willie de Jesús – 1990, 1994
 Victor Ruiz – 2010

LVSM Defensive Player of the Year
 Edwin Fernandez – 1986, 1987, 1989, 1990, 1991

LVSM Final Most Valuable Player
 Jackson Rivera - 2021
 Steve Klosterman - 2007
 Víctor "Vitito" Rivera – 1997, 2001, 2003, 2006
 Ángel Pérez – 2005
 Víctor "Chiqui" Bird – 2004
 José L. Díaz – 1998

Executive of the Year
Ángel L. Colón – 2005

Coliseum

The team always plays their home games at the Gelito Ortega Coliseum, “ El Nido” in Naranjito, which is located about 40 minutes from the Capital San Juan. The Coliseum has a capacity for 3,000 spectators.

Staff
  Alexis Aponte – Chairman
  Jamille Torres – Head Coach
   – Assistant Coach
   '’Stadistics  Félix Gordillo – Physical Therapist  Félix – Trainer''

2012-2013 TEAM

2010-2011 TEAM

2009-2010 TEAM

2008 LVSM Division 1 season
This season was dedicated by the team for a local team-association "Los Batatas".

2007 LVSM Division 1 season
This season was dedicated by the team for the Modesto Nieves Family.

2006 LVSM Division 1 season
This season was dedicated by the team for the boxer Félix "Tito" Trinidad.

2005 LVSM Division 1 season
This season was dedicated by the team in the memory of Roberto Walker Clemente.

2004 LVSM Division 1 season

2003 LVSM Division 1 season
This season was dedicated by the team in the memory of Maralisa Colón Berríos.

Coaches

References

External links
 Official site] (Spanish)
Facebook Official site
Twitter Official site
Facebook
MySpace
Puerto Rico League Official Site

1958 establishments in Puerto Rico
Puerto Rican volleyball clubs